Ade Suhendra (born June 10, 1987) is an Indonesian footballer who currently plays for Gresik United in the Indonesia Super League.

References

External links

1987 births
Association football defenders
Living people
Indonesian footballers
Liga 1 (Indonesia) players
Gresik United players
PSPS Pekanbaru players
Indonesian Premier Division players
Persih Tembilahan players